In most Unix and Unix-like operating systems, the ps program (short for "process status") displays the currently-running processes.  A related Unix utility named top provides a real-time view of the running processes.

Implementations
KolibriOS includes an implementation of the  command. The  command has also been ported to the IBM i operating system. In Windows PowerShell, ps is a predefined command alias for the Get-Process cmdlet, which essentially serves the same purpose.

Examples
# ps
  PID TTY          TIME CMD
 7431 pts/0    00:00:00 su
 7434 pts/0    00:00:00 bash
18585 pts/0    00:00:00 ps

Users can pipeline ps with other commands, such as less to view the process status output one page at a time:

$ ps -A | less

Users can also utilize the ps command in conjunction with the grep  command (see the pgrep and pkill commands) to find information about a single process, such as its id:$ # Trying to find the PID of `firefox-bin` which is 2701
$ ps -A | grep firefox-bin
2701 ?        22:16:04 firefox-bin

The use of pgrep simplifies the syntax and avoids potential race conditions:
$ pgrep -l firefox-bin
2701 firefox-bin

To see every process running as root in user format:
# ps -U root -u
USER   PID  %CPU %MEM    VSZ   RSS TT  STAT STARTED        TIME COMMAND
root     1   0.0  0.0   9436   128  -  ILs  Sun00AM     0:00.12 /sbin/init --

Header line

* = Often abbreviated

Options
ps has many options. On operating systems that support the SUS and POSIX standards, ps commonly runs with the options -ef, where "-e" selects every process and "-f" chooses the "full" output format. Another common option on these systems is -l, which specifies the "long" output format.

Most systems derived from BSD fail to accept the SUS and POSIX standard options because of historical conflicts. (For example, the "e" or "-e" option will display environment variables.) On such systems, ps commonly runs with the non-standard options aux, where "a" lists all processes on a terminal, including those of other users, "x" lists all processes without controlling terminals and "u" adds a column for the controlling user for each process. For maximum compatibility, there is no "-" in front of the "aux". "ps auxww" provides complete information about the process, including all parameters.

See also
 Task manager
 kill (command)
 List of Unix commands
 nmon — a system monitor tool for the AIX and Linux operating systems.
 pgrep
 pstree (Unix)
 top (Unix)
 lsof

References

Further reading

External links

 
 
 
 Show all running processes in Linux using ps command
 In Unix, what do the output fields of the ps command mean?

Unix SUS2008 utilities
Unix process- and task-management-related software
Plan 9 commands
Inferno (operating system) commands
IBM i Qshell commands